The African pygmy hedgehog is either of two closely related hedgehogs:

 Domesticated hedgehog
 Four-toed hedgehog

Hedgehogs
Mammal common names